The Battle of India Muerta was a battle between the Luso-Brazilian forces under the command of Sebastião Pinto de Araújo Correia against the artiguists led by Fructuoso Rivera in Rocha, present-day Uruguay. The battle lasted for four and a half hours and ended in a Luso-Brazilian victory.

References

Citations

Bibliography

External links
 Original report of the battle written by Sebastião Correia and sent to Carlos Frederico Lecor

India Muerta
India Muerta
India Muerta
1816 in Portugal
1816 in Brazil
1816 in Uruguay